HSX may refer to:
 Helically Symmetric Experiment
 Hengshan West railway station, China Railway pinyin code HSX
 Ho Chi Minh City Stock Exchange
 Hollywood Stock Exchange, an online game
 Hoshiarpur railway station, in Punjab, India
 HSX Films, now Ignite Entertainment
 HSX Handbrake Shifter, Brazilian manufacturer of racing simulation devices
 HSX: Hypersonic Xtreme, a video game
 Mitsubishi HSX, a concept car